The 1st Company Massachusetts Sharpshooters was a sharpshooter unit in the Union Army during the American Civil War.

Service
The 1st Company Massachusetts Sharpshooters was organized in Lynn, Massachusetts and mustered in for three years service on September 2, 1861. The company was originally recruited for Colonel Hiram Berdan's sharpshooter regiments. When the men were informed that they would lose their enlistment bounty, they declined to join Berdan's regiments and instead remained independent. Most of the recruits tended to be skilled workmen who were competitive shooters tending to be older than the average Union soldier, and these men also tended to be of the larger physical size. They were armed with heavy, custom target rifles and Sharps rifles during their service.

The company was attached to 3rd Brigade, 2nd Division, II Corps, Army of the Potomac, but nominally operated with the 15th Massachusetts Infantry to July 1864, and with the 19th Massachusetts Infantry to September 1864.

The 1st Company Massachusetts Sharpshooters mustered out September 6, 1864.

Detailed service

1861
 Left Massachusetts for Washington, D.C., September 2. 
 Picket and outpost duty on the Upper Potomac River from Conrad's Ferry to Harrison's Island until October 20. 
 Operations on the Potomac River October 21–24. 
 Battle of Ball's Bluff October 21. 
 At Harpers Ferry and Bolivar Heights until March 7, 1862.

1862
 At Charlestown until March 10. Capt. John Saunders of Salem, MA commanding
 At Berryville until March 13. 
 Movement toward Winchester and return to Bolivar Heights March 13–15. 
 The Peninsula campaign (March 17-August 4)
 Moved to Fortress Monroe March 22-April 1. 
 Siege of Yorktown April 5-May 4.  — Attached to Gorman's 1st Brigade, Sedgwick's 2nd Division, Sumner's II Corps, McClellan's Army of the Potomac
 Battle of Fair Oaks, Seven Pines, May 31-June 1.
 Seven Days before Richmond June 25-July 1. — Attached to Sully's 1st Brigade, Sedgwick's 2nd Division, Sumner's II Corps
 Peach Orchard and Battle of Savage's Station June 29. 
 White Oak Swamp and Glendale June 30.
 Battle of Malvern Hill July 1. 
 At Harrison's Landing until August 15. 
 Movement to Alexandria August 15–28
 To Centreville, Second Battle of Bull Run August 29–30. 
 Cover Pope's retreat August 31-September 1. 
 Battle of Antietam, September 16–17. — Attached to Gorman's 1st Brigade, Sedgwick's 2nd Division, Sumner's II Corps — Supported II Corps attack, sniping at opposing officers and snipers. Captain Sanders killed with nine others.
 Moved to Harpers Ferry September 22 and duty there until October 30. 
 Movement to Falmouth, Va., October 30-November 20.
 On Picket, Falmouth to 12 December — 9 December, eighteen men on muster roll. Captain William Plummer of Cambridge, MA, arrived with forty recruits and took command of the company. 
 Battle of Fredericksburg December 12–15. — Attached to Sully's 1st Brigade, Howard's 2nd Division, Couch's II Corps — Provided counter-sniper fire during construction of pontoon bridges and crossing 11 and 12 December. Set up positions on outskirts of city below Marye's Heights targeting artillerymen on the heights.

1863
 "Mud March" January 20–24. 
 Chancellorsville Campaign April 27-May 6. — Attached to Gibbon's 2nd Division, Couch's II Corps, Hooker's Army of the Potomac
 Maryes Heights, Second Battle of Fredericksburg, May 3. 
 Salem Heights May 3–4. 
 Banks' Ford May 4. 
 Battle of Gettysburg, July 2–4. — Attached to Gibbon's/Harrow's 2nd Division, Hancock's/Gibbon's/Hays' II Corps, Meade's Army of the Potomac —
Arrived morning 2 July, positioned at rock wall on the north end of Cemetery Ridge, several squads were detached and sent to different parts of the line. Cleared out Confederate snipers occupying Bliss farm. In late afternoon, when II Corps retook Bliss farm, a squad went with them to snipe from the farm. No losses 2 July.
On 3 July, unit dueled with Confederate snipers in buildings in Gettysburg facing Cemetery Hill and Ridge. During Pickett's Charge, unit concentrated targeting on officers. Suffered four dead, three wounded.
 Advance from the Rappahannock to the Rapidan September 13–17. 
 Bristoe Campaign October 9–22. — Attached to Webb's 2nd Division, Warren's II Corps, Meade's Army of the Potomac
 Battle of Bristoe Station October 14. 
 Advance to line of the Rappahannock, Second Battle of Rappahannock Station November 7–8. 
 Mine Run Campaign November 26-December 2. — Attached to Morehead 3rd Brigade, Webb's 2nd Division, Warren's II Corps, Meade's Army of the Potomac 
 Robertson's Tavern or Locust Grove November 27.

1864
 Morton's Ford February 6–7. 
 Picketing Rapidan River until May 1. 
 The Overland Campaign May 4 – June 24. — Attached to Webb's 1st Brigade, Gibbon's 2nd Division, Hancock's II Corps, Meade's Army of the Potomac 
 Battle of the Wilderness May 5–7. 
 Laurel Hill May 8. 
 Battle of Spotsylvania Court House, May 8–21. 
 Po River May 10. 
 Assault on the Salient at Spotsylvania Court House May 12. 
 Battle of North Anna River May 23-26 
 Line of the Pamunkey May 26–28. 
 Battle of Totopotomoy Creek May 28–31. 
 Battle of Cold Harbor June 1–12. — Attached to McKeen's/Haskell's/Pierce's 1st Brigade, Gibbon's 2nd Division, Hancock's II Corps, Meade's Army of the Potomac 
 Before Petersburg June 16–18. 
 Siege of Petersburg June 16-July 12. — Attached to Pierce's 1st Brigade, Gibbon's 2nd Division, Hancock's/Birney's II Corps, Meade's Army of the Potomac
 Battle of Jerusalem Plank Road June 22–23. 
 Demonstration north of the James River July 27–29. 
 Battle of Deep Bottom July 27–28. 
 Strawberry Plains, Deep Bottom, August 14–18. 
 Ream's Station August 25.

Casualties
The company lost a total of 39 men during service; 3 officers and 21 enlisted men killed or mortally wounded, 15 enlisted men due to disease.

Commanders
 Captain John Saunders - killed in action at the Battle of Antietam
 Captain William Plumer

Armament

Throughout their service, the company was armed with custom, muzzle-loading target rifles equipped with telescopic sights running the length of the barrel. The larger than average physical size of the unit members proved an asset in carrying these weapons. These target rifles were a mix of heavy bench rifles and lighter out of hand rifles. Hawkins and Morgan James were among the manufacturers of these rifles. 

Starting at Antietam, they also carried Sharps rifles in the field firing over the iron sights. The Sharps Rifle was produced by the Sharps Rifle Manufacturing Company in Hartford, Connecticut. The Sharps made a superior sniper weapon of greater accuracy than the more commonly issued muzzle-loading rifled muskets. This was due mainly to the higher rate of fire of the breech loading mechanism and superior quality of manufacture, as well as the ease of which it could be reloaded from a kneeling or prone position.

See also

 15th Regiment Massachusetts Volunteer Infantry
 19th Regiment Massachusetts Volunteer Infantry
 120th Regiment Massachusetts Volunteer Infantry
 List of Massachusetts Civil War units
 Massachusetts in the American Civil War

Notes

References
 Civilwarhome - Gettysburg Union order of battle
 Civil War Trust - Gettysburg Union order of battle
 Coates, Earl J., and Thomas S. Dean. An Introduction to Civil War Small Arms. Gettysburg, Penn.: Thomas Publications, 1990. .
 Dyer, Frederick H. A Compendium of the War of the Rebellion (Des Moines, IA:  Dyer Pub. Co.), 1908.
 Eicher, John H. "Gettysburg Order of Battle" at Gettysburg Discussion Group website.
 Ellis, Alden C. Jr. The Massachusetts Andrew Sharpshooters: A Civil War History and Roster (Jefferson, NC: McFarland & Company, Inc.), 2012. 
 
 First Company Massachusetts “Andrew Sharpshooters” at Gettysburg
 Gettysburg Discussion Group - Union order of battle
 Gettysburg National Military Park - The Army of the Potomac at Gettysburg
 Marcot, Roy - Marron, Edward - Paxton, Ron. "Sharps Firearms: The Percussion Era 1848 - 1865", April 2019
 Sellers, Frank M. Sharps Firearms. North Hollywood, Calif: Beinfeld Pub, 1978. .
 
 Smith, Winston O. The Sharps Rifle, Its History, Development and Operation. New York: William Morrow and Company, 1943.
 U.S. War Department, The War of the Rebellion: a Compilation of the Official Records of the Union and Confederate Armies. Washington, DC: U.S. Government Printing Office, 1880–1901.
 

Attribution

External links
 1st Company Massachusetts Sharpshooters monument at Gettysburg

Military units and formations established in 1861
Military units and formations disestablished in 1864
Units and formations of the Union Army from Massachusetts
Sharpshooter units and formations of the American Civil War
1861 establishments in Massachusetts